Aoraia macropis is a species of moth of the family Hepialidae. It is endemic to New Zealand and is found in the mountains of southern Central Otago. It was described by John S. Dugdale in 1994.

The wingspan is 38–45 mm for males. The forewing ground colour is uniform smoky brown with a dull ash-white pattern.  The hindwings are contrasting pale brown or yellowish-fawn. Females are brachypterous and dull brown.  Adults are on wing from February to April.

References

External links

Citizen science observations

Moths described in 1994
Hepialidae
Moths of New Zealand
Endemic fauna of New Zealand
Endemic moths of New Zealand